Bernardo Costa da Rosa (born 20 September 2000) is a Brazilian footballer who plays as a midfielder for Pardubice.

Career

In 2016, Rosa joined the youth academy of English Premier League side West Ham United. In 2022, he signed for Pardubice in the Czech Republic. On 31 July 2022, he debuted for Pardubice during a 0–2 loss to Budějovice.

References

External links

 

2000 births
Association football midfielders
Footballers from Rio de Janeiro (city)
Brazilian expatriate footballers
Brazilian expatriate sportspeople in the Czech Republic
Brazilian expatriate sportspeople in England
Brazilian footballers
Czech First League players
Expatriate footballers in the Czech Republic
Expatriate footballers in England
FK Pardubice players
Living people